The Iowa State University Digital Press (also known as ISTUDP) is a digital university press affiliated with Iowa State University, located in Ames, Iowa. The press, which is a unit of the Iowa State University Library, was organized in 2018 and is dedicated to the creation, publication, and dissemination of open-access books and journal articles.

Often seen as a successor of sorts to the Iowa State University Press (a now-defunct publisher that had previously been an active member of the Association of American University Presses), the Iowa State University Digital Press was founded to "support of Iowa State University’s land-grant mission." The publisher is currently a member of the Library Publishing Coalition.

Publications

Notable journals
 Journal of Librarianship and Scholarly Communication
 Journal of Technology, Management, and Applied Engineering
 Midwest Archives Conference (MAC) Newsletter

See also

 List of English-language book publishing companies
 List of university presses

References

External links 
 Official website
 Pressbooks website

Publishing companies established in 2018
Iowa
2018 establishments in Iowa
Open access (publishing)
Open access projects
Library publishing